William de Wylton DD (also Wilton) was an English medieval college Fellow and university chancellor.

William de Wylton was a Fellow of Balliol College, University College, and Queen's College, all in Oxford. He was a Doctor of Divinity and held the office of Chancellor of the University of Oxford between 1373 and 1376.

References

Year of birth unknown
Year of death unknown
Fellows of Balliol College, Oxford
Fellows of University College, Oxford
Fellows of The Queen's College, Oxford
Chancellors of the University of Oxford
14th-century English people